Boris Shlapak is a former professional American football player who played placekicker one season for the Baltimore Colts. As a free agent, he kicked two field goals for the Buffalo Bills in the 1974 Pro Football Hall of Fame Game in Canton, Ohio. Shlapak spent his freshman year of college at Drake University before transferring to Michigan State University. He also played soccer professionally in the North American Soccer League for the Chicago Sting after changing his name to Ian Stone. He played in one league match and several friendlies for the Sting in 1975.

External links
 NASL stats

References

1950 births
American people of Ukrainian descent
American football placekickers
Drake University alumni
Baltimore Colts players
Michigan State Spartans football players
Living people
Footballers who switched code
North American Soccer League (1968–1984) players
Chicago Sting (NASL) players
Players of American football from Chicago
Soccer players from Chicago
Association football forwards
American soccer players